Plaid Pantry is a chain of privately owned convenience stores based in Beaverton, Oregon, United States.  Of 108 locations, one is in the Seattle, Washington area, eight are near Salem, and the remainder are in the Portland metropolitan area.

Ownership 
Plaid Pantries, Inc. traces its founding to 1960 by John Piacentini.  The name refers to the plaid decoration originally on both the store buildings and the roadside pole signs.

Plaid Pantry can date its origins to the late 1950s when a California investor built multiple stores in the Portland area with the financial backing of Alpenrose Dairy.  Stores built from scratch by Handy Pantry/Alpenrose were under the Handy Pantry name; stores made by converting an existing structure were referred to as Speedy Mart.  In 1963, the Handy Pantry/Speedy Mart chain filed for bankruptcy.  Alpenrose Dairy, the major creditor, gained control of all the stores.

In 1960, John Piacentini decided to go into business for himself and opened his first store in east Portland under the name John's One-Stop. He opened a few more stores and eventually was offered the opportunity to purchase the Handy Pantry/Speedy Mart chain with financial backing by Alpenrose Dairy.  Piacentini changed the name of all the stores to Plaid Pantry; the stores continued to stock Alpenrose Dairy products.

Founder's sale and death
Nearly 20 years later, when Piacentini tentatively sold the company to Convenient Food Mart (CFM) in March 1987, he had built it into a chain of 161 stores in the Portland and Seattle areas.  That sale fell through about two months later, after CFM conducted its due diligence audit.  A subsequent leveraged buyout a year later led to chapter 11 bankruptcy on March 13, 1989, and a subsequent reorganization.  Piacentini died later in 1988, and several lawsuits followed.

Since 1991

A series of transactions made public in 1998 put half of the chain under the ownership of a holding company majority-owned by Houlihan Lokey Howard & Zukin (HLHZ), with minority ownership stakes held by senior Plaid Pantry management including CEO Chris Girard.

The details of the 1998 deal and several subsequent transactions became the subject of a lawsuit in 2007 before the United States District Court for the District of Oregon between HLHZ and Girard. The lawsuit was settled in 2008.

In May 2019, the company terminated an employee who produced a gun during an attempted robbery involving a suspect with a hatchet at one of its Clackamas County stores. The reason given for termination is for violating the company's no weapon policy.

Founder's role in the Oregon Bottle Bill
In 1969, as the Oregon Bottle Bill was contemplated as a way to reduce litter, large retailers opposed the idea and said that no one would return bottles and cans for a two-cent deposit. Furthermore, opponents of the bill claimed that small grocery stores would face an extraordinary financial burden from receiving and processing thousands of bottles and cans, potentially bankrupting several stores. John Piacentini disagreed. He  offered a half cent for each soda or beer bottle returned to Plaid Pantry stores.  Piacentini even stated that he hoped Oregonians "bury me in litter."

Alcohol sales

In the late 1990s, Plaid Pantry failed 30-40% of spot checks conducted by the OLCC to determine if the company was selling alcohol or tobacco to minors; by March 2000, they became the first retailer recognized by the OLCC as a "responsible vendor", a milestone reached due to changes to the company's training and its credit card validation system, which were updated to simplify a clerk's ability to ascertain whether a customer was of legal age.

References

External links

Plaid Pantry succeeds by shrinking - Portland Business Journal

Companies based in Beaverton, Oregon
Privately held companies based in Oregon
Economy of the Northwestern United States
Convenience stores of the United States
Companies that filed for Chapter 11 bankruptcy in 1963
Companies that filed for Chapter 11 bankruptcy in 1989
Retail companies established in 1960
1960 establishments in Oregon